Sondre Meisfjord (born 18 March 1975 in Oslo, Norway) is a Norwegian folk and jazz musician (double bass and cello), and composer, raised in Frei, Nordmøre, known from bands like Come Shine, Flukt, Gjermund Larsen Trio.

Career 
Meisfjord attended the Jazz program at Trondheim Musikkonservatorium (1998–2001).

He won Spellemannprisen (2002) with the jazz band Come Shine (1998–2003), played Norwegian folk music with the trio 'Flukt', Irish folk music in 'Musharings', cool jazz in John Pål Inderberg's The Zetting, pop in Siri Gjære's band, and was in the Trondheim Jazz Orchestra with Pat Metheny.  Other musicians he has worked with include Odd Nordstoga, Dadafon, Kringkastingsorkesteret, Trondheim Soloists, Kari Bremnes, Dipsomaniacs, Gjermund Larsen, Tord Gustavsen, and Stig Rennestraum.

Recently he has played with the 'Urban Tunélls Klezmerband'.

Honors 
2002: Spellemannprisen in the class Jazz for the album Do Do That Voodoo, within Come Shine

Discography 

Within Come Shine
2001: Come Shine (Curling Legs)
2002: Do Do That Voodoo (Curling Legs)
2003: Come Shine With The Norwegian Radio Orchestra In Concert (Curling Legs)
2002: Do Do That Voodoo (Curling Legs)

Within Flukt
2001: Spill (2L)

With Sissel Kyrkjebø
2005: Nordisk Vinternatt (Mercury)

With Roger Johansen
2007: World Of Emily (Inner Ear)

With Kari Bremnes
2007: Reise (Strange Ways Records)
2009: Ly (Kirkelig Kulturverksted)
2012: Og Så Kom Resten Av Livet (Kirkelig Kulturverksted)

With Odd Nordstoga
2008: Pilegrim (Sonet Music)

Within Gjermund Larsen Trio
2008: Ankomst (Heilo)
2010: Aurum (Heilo)
2013: Reise (Heilo)
2016: Salmeklang (Heilo)

With Gabriel Fliflet
2008: Rio Aga (NorCD)

References

External links 

1977 births
Living people
20th-century Norwegian male musicians
21st-century Norwegian male musicians
20th-century Norwegian musicians
21st-century Norwegian musicians
21st-century double-bassists
Musicians from Oslo
Male double-bassists
Male jazz musicians
Norwegian folk musicians
Norwegian jazz upright-bassists
Norwegian University of Science and Technology alumni
Jazz double-bassists
Come Shine members
Spellemannprisen winners